Prince Vasily Alexandrovich Dolgorukov (tr. ; 1868–1918) was an advisor to Russian Emperor Nicholas II, and a Marshal from 1914 to 1917. After the arrest of the Russian Imperial Family following the February Revolution, he voluntarily accompanied the family into internal exile in Tsarskoe Selo and later Tobolsk. He was barred from joining them in Yekaterinburg in April 1918, and was killed by order of the Bolshevik government in that July.

Early life

Vasily Alexandrovich Dolgorukov was born in 1868 to Prince and Princess Alexander Vasilievich and Mary Sergeyevna Dolgorukov.

Career

In 1907 Dolgorukov became an adjutant, in 1910 a General, and in 1914 a commander of the Imperial Guard cavalry regiment, the Life-Guard Horse Artillery unit. During World War I, he was appointed Marshal of the Imperial Court. In this position, he assisted his stepfather, Count Pavel Benckendorff, in giving military advice to the Tsar. Deeply devoted to the Tsar, on August 14, 1917, he voluntarily accompanied the Imperial family to imprisonment in Tobolsk. He was separated from them when they were transferred to Ekaterinburg.

Dolgorukov was initially allowed to stay in the city when he arrived at the end of April, but was arrested by the Cheka secret police, along with Count Ilya Tatischev, as "enemies of the socialist revolution", after maps of the region showing river routes were allegedly found in his lodgings. During imprisonment, Dolgorukov constantly pressured the British Consulate in Ekaterinburg to help the Imperial family, using pencil-written notes smuggled from his prison cell. Accused of plotting to rescue the Imperial family, Dolgorukov and Tatishchev were taken by Bolshevik revolutionary Grigory Nikulin and Cheka agents beyond the city's Ivanovskoe Cemetery on July 10, shot in the head and thrown into a pit. Nikulin went on to murder the Romanov family a week later. The bodies of Dolgorukov and Tatishchev were never found.

Canonization
On October 31/November 1, 1981 the Russian Orthodox Church Outside Russia canonized the Prince as The Holy Martyr Warrior, Vasily.

References

 Helen Rappaport, Ekaterinburg: The Last Days of the Romanovs, 2008, .
 Rappaport, Helen. Four Sisters: The Lost Lives of the Romanov Grand Duchesses. Pan Macmillan, 2014. 

1868 births
1918 deaths
Imperial Russian Army generals
Russian military personnel of World War I
Russian princes
Vasily Alexandrovich
Russian saints of the Eastern Orthodox Church
Executed Russian people
People executed by Russia by firearm
20th-century executions by Russia
Victims of Red Terror in Soviet Russia